"Machine" is a song by American pop rock band Imagine Dragons, who co-wrote it with their producer Alex da Kid. It is the third single from the band's fourth studio album Origins.

Background
A snippet of the track was teased in the trailer for Origins. The song was officially announced on social media the day before it was released. On Twitter, the cover art for the song was posted, as well as the caption "Our new song Machine drops TOMORROW morning".

Composition
The song has been labeled as arena rock and industrial by critics.

Critical reception
In a positive review of the album by The Independent, the song (along with another single, "Natural") was described as "stomping, stadium filling anthems that scream defiance and are what most would brand "classic" Imagine Dragons". Billboard also described the song as "explosive" and "powerful".

Lyrics
The song's lyrics are about "living outside the box others might put you in" and possible references to social and political realities.

Live performances
"Machine" was performed live for the first time at the Cosmopolitan in Las Vegas on November 7, along with three other songs from the album: "Natural", "Zero" and "Bad Liar".

Personnel

Imagine Dragons
 Dan Reynolds – lead vocals, keyboards
 Wayne Sermon – electric guitar, backing vocals
 Ben McKee – bass guitar, keyboards, backing vocals
 Daniel Platzman – drums, percussion

Production

 Alex da Kid – production

Charts

Weekly charts

Year-end charts

References

2018 songs
2018 singles
Imagine Dragons songs
Songs written by Alex da Kid
Songs written by Dan Reynolds (musician)
Songs written by Ben McKee
Songs written by Wayne Sermon
Songs written by Daniel Platzman
Kidinakorner singles
Interscope Records singles